The Dongfeng Succe (帅客) or Dongfeng Yumsun is a compact MPV produced by Zhengzhou Nissan Automobile, a subsidiary of Dongfeng Motor Co., Ltd.

Overview
The Dongfeng Succe was originally built on the same platforms as the Nissan Serena (C24) with a complete makeover on the exterior styling to be sold with a lower price tag.
As of 2018, prices of the post-facelift Dongfeng Succe ranges from 68,800 to 91,800 yuan.

Starting from 2013, Dongfeng Succe was sold in Indonesia by Xarrina Motor Indonesia as ZNA Succe.

2018 facelift
The Succe received a facelift in 2018 featuring a restyled front fascia and a restyled rear end.

Dongfeng Succe EV
The 2018 model year also introduce the electric version of the Dongfeng Succe. The Dongfeng Succe EV was introduced during the 2018 Beijing Auto Show, and is powered by a 82 hp（60kw）electric motor, and is available as a passenger van or a panel van for the logistics industry. Both models feature a  49.572 kW·h battery and a 301 km range for the passenger van and 298 km range for the panel van version.

An update was introduced for the 2019 model year. The update changed the interior seating configuration from 2+3+2 to 2+2+3, and the battery was upgraded to 54.35kWh which is capable of a 320 km NEDC range.

References

External links

Succe Official website

Compact MPVs
Dongfeng Succe
Cars introduced in 2007
Front-wheel-drive vehicles
Minivans
Cars of China
2010s cars
Production electric cars
Electric vehicles
Electric vans